The Constitution of Southern Sudan was the 2005 Interim Constitution of Southern Sudan, as established by the Government of Sudan and the Sudan People's Liberation Army/Movement within the framework of the Comprehensive Peace Agreement ending the Second Sudanese Civil War, signed into practice on 9 January 2005.

The constitution establishes a presidential system of government headed by a President who is both Head of State, Head of Government, and the Commander-in-Chief of the armed forces. 

The constitution establishes English and Arabic as the official languages.

The constitution establishes three levels of government: national, state and local.

The constitution prohibits slavery, and torture, limits capital punishment, and establishes equal rights for men and women, and equality before the law.

The separate "Transitional Constitution of the Republic of South Sudan" was drafted by a Southern Sudan Constitutional Drafting Committee and adopted by a two-thirds majority vote of the South Sudan Legislative Assembly. This new constitution came in force on 9 July 2011 when South Sudan was proclaimed as independent state.

Notes

References

External links
 South Sudan's Constitution of 2011, The Constitute project.

South Sudan
Government of South Sudan
2005 in South Sudan
2005 in law